Michael James Sis (born January 9, 1960) is an American prelate of the Roman Catholic Church. He has been serving as the Bishop of the Diocese of San Angelo in Texas since 2013.

Early life and education
Michael James Sis was born on January 9, 1960, in Mt. Holly, New Jersey.  He was the fourth of five children born to Raymond and Janice (née Murphy) Sis. The family later moved to Bryan, Texas, where he attended St. Joseph School and the Bryan Independent School District.  As a teenager, he volunteered in religious education and youth programs in his parish.  Sis graduated from Bryan High School in 1978.

Sis earned a Bachelor of Philosophy degree in 1982 from the Moreau Seminary at the University of Notre Dame in Norte Dame, Indiana. Sis spent a summer of missionary service in Tanzania.  He continued his studies in Rome, earning a Bachelor of Theology degree from the Pontifical Gregorian University and a Licentiate in Moral Theology from the Alphonsian Academy.  While in Rome, Sis performed volunteer work with Ethiopian refugees.

Priesthood
Sis was ordained a priest by Bishop John E. McCarthy for the Diocese of Austin on July 19, 1986.

After his ordination, Sis was assigned as the associate pastor at Cristo Rey Parish in Austin, Texas.  He took on the additional task of associate pastor in campus ministry at Texas A&M University in College Station, Texas in 1989. From 1990 to 1992, Sis served as the associate pastor at St. Mary's Cathedral Parish in Austin.  He then returned to Texas A&M as associate pastor in 1992.  Sis served as pastor at the university from 1993 to 2006.

In 2006, Sis left Texas A&M to become the vocation director for the diocese. He was reassigned in 2009 as pastor of St. Thomas More Parish in Austin, then in 2010 was named the vicar general and moderator of the curia of the diocese until 2013. Sis also served on the Presbyteral Council, the Priest Personnel Board, the College of Consultors, the Vocation Team, the Permanent Diaconate Admissions Committee, and the Bishop's Advisory Council.

Bishop of San Angelo
Pope Francis named Sis as the bishop of the Diocese of San Angelo on December 12, 2013. He was consecrated a bishop on January 27, 2014, by Archbishop Gustavo García-Siller; Bishop Michael Pfeifer and Bishop Joe S. Vásquez were the co-consecrators.  The liturgy was celebrated in the Junell Center at Angelo State University in San Angelo, Texas Sis's father, Deacon Raymond Sis, assisted at the consecration.

See also

 Catholic Church hierarchy
 Catholic Church in the United States
 Historical list of the Catholic bishops of the United States
 List of Catholic bishops of the United States
 Lists of patriarchs, archbishops, and bishops

References

External links
Roman Catholic Diocese of San Angelo
Roman Catholic Diocese of Austin

Episcopal succession

1960 births
Living people
People from Mount Holly, New Jersey
People from Austin, Texas
People from San Angelo, Texas
University of Notre Dame alumni
Pontifical Gregorian University alumni
21st-century Roman Catholic bishops in the United States
Catholics from Texas
Catholics from New Jersey
Bishops appointed by Pope Francis